The Bachelor Apartment House is an historic structure located in the Northwest Quadrant of Washington, D.C.  The architectural firm of Wood, Donn & Deming designed the building.  The building architecture offers an fascinating approach to a specific project, achieving an elegant and intimate residential standard in a multi-unit commercial structure. 

It is believed to be the only example of a luxury apartment building built for single men still standing in the city.  It is also one of the first apartment buildings in Washington with a Tudor Revival façade.  The building, which now contains offices, was listed on the National Register of Historic Places in 1978.

Residents
Hubbard Bowyer McDonald (1850-1907).

References

Residential buildings completed in 1905
Office buildings in Washington, D.C.
Georgian Revival architecture in Washington, D.C.
Residential buildings on the National Register of Historic Places in Washington, D.C.
Apartment buildings in Washington, D.C.
1905 establishments in Washington, D.C.